Gostwyck Shire was a local government area in the New England region of New South Wales, Australia.

Gostwyck Shire was proclaimed on 7 March 1906, one of 134 shires created after the passing of the Local Government (Shires) Act 1905. 

The shire office was in Uralla.  Towns and villages in the shire included  Bundarra, Yarrowyck, Kingstown and Kentucky.

Gostwyck Shire was amalgamated with the Municipality of Uralla to form Uralla Shire on 1 January 1948.

References

Former local government areas of New South Wales
1906 establishments in Australia
1948 disestablishments in Australia